EWR is the IATA airport code for Newark Liberty International Airport.

EWR can also refer to:

 East West Rail, a proposed rail line in England
 Elkhart and Western Railroad, a railroad in Indiana
 Entwicklungsring Süd, a German aircraft manufacturer
 Extreme Warfare Revenge, a computer game
Early-warning radar, a radar detection system
East Worthing railway station, a railway station in Sussex, England